The Post-Capitalist Society (1993) is a book by management professor and sociologist Peter Drucker.

Overview

The book states that the "First World Nations" and in particular the United States have entered a post-capitalism system of production where the capital is no longer present because it doesn't belong to one person or family but to a series of organizations such as insurance companies, banks, etc. Because of this, normal citizens become virtually owners of the great American enterprises, being owners of the capital, therefore, not destroying but overcoming the capitalism. The book foresees that the post-capitalist society will become a society of organizations where every organization will be highly specialized in its particular field.

References

Business books
1993 non-fiction books